Mickaël Mawem (born 3 August 1990) is a French professional rock climber. He qualified for the 2020 Summer Olympics through finishing 7th at the 2019 IFSC Climbing World Championships. He also won the bouldering event at the 2019 IFSC Climbing European Championships.

Mawem was first selected to the national team in 2014.

His older brother Bassa is also a professional climber.

References

Living people
1990 births
French rock climbers
Sportspeople from Nîmes
Sport climbers at the 2020 Summer Olympics
Olympic sport climbers of France
20th-century French people
21st-century French people